The Wine Geese or Winegeese is a term used for Irish emigrants and exiles who established vineyards overseas, particularly in France. The term was coined in 2005 by Irish wine historian, Ted Murphy.

History
In 1691, after a defeat in Williamite Wars, thousands of Irish soldiers left their country and relocated to Continental Europe and some of whom established notable businesses. 

Among the notable winemakers who emigrated to France, include Skibbereen-born Abraham Lawton, Cork-born Richard Hennessy, and Fermanagh-born Thomas Barton who founded Château Langoa-Barton and Château Léoville Barton. Around fourteen châteaux of Irish-origin are operational in Bordeaux, France.

In Australia, they established Clare Valley wine region.

In 1990, a six-part television series, The Wine Geese, produced by Coco Television Production, was shown on the television.

Notable wineries
 Hennessy, founded by Richard Hennessy
 Château Langoa-Barton
 Château Léoville Barton
 Château MacCarthy
 Château Lynch-Bages
 Château Kirwan
 Château Phélan Ségur
 Château Clarke
 Château Dillon
 Chateau de Fieuzal

References

Further reading
 Murphy, Ted (2005). A Kingdom of Wine: A Celebration of Ireland's Winegeese

Irish diaspora
Irish culture
Irish emigrants to France